Metarctia tricolorana is a moth of the  subfamily Arctiinae. It was described by Wichgraf in 1922. It is found in Uganda.

References

 Natural History Museum Lepidoptera generic names catalog

Endemic fauna of Uganda
Metarctia
Moths described in 1922